Royal Air Force Halton, or more simply RAF Halton, is one of the largest Royal Air Force stations in the United Kingdom. It is located near the village of Halton near Wendover, Buckinghamshire. The site has been in use since the First World War but is due to close by December 2027.

History

The first recorded military aviation at Halton took place in 1913 when the then owner of the Halton estate, Alfred de Rothschild, invited No 3 Squadron of the Royal Flying Corps to conduct manoeuvres on his land.  Following a gentlemen's agreement between Rothschild and Lord Kitchener, the estate was used by the British Army throughout the First World War.  In 1916 the Royal Flying Corps moved its air mechanics school from Farnborough, Hampshire to Halton, and in 1917, the school was permanently accommodated in workshops built by German PoWs.

The estate was purchased by the British Government for the nascent Royal Air Force at the end of the First World War for £112,000.

In 1919 Lord Trenchard established the No. 1 School of Technical Training at RAF Halton for RAF aircraft apprentices, which remained at the station until it moved to RAF Cosford in the early 1990s. Also in 1919, Halton House – a French-style mansion built for Lionel de Rothschild – was re-opened as the station's Officers' Mess, a role which the grade II listed building continues as today.

During the Second World War, RAF Halton continued its training role.  Additionally No 112 Squadron and No 402 Squadron of the Royal Canadian Air Force were based at Halton for part of the war. No. 1448 (Radar Calibration) Flight was converted into No. 529 Squadron at Halton in June 1943. Initially, the squadron flew the Cierva C.30 and the de Havilland Hornet Moth and by the end of the war, the squadron was competent with autogyro aircraft.

In July 1952 the uncrowned Queen Elizabeth II performed one of her first duties as Sovereign by presenting a colour to Number 1 School of Technical Training; the first to be awarded to an apprentice school, and the first to be presented to an 'other rank' when Sergeant Apprentice Hines, of the 63rd Entry, received the colour from Her Majesty.

In 1967, RAF Halton was the site of the unsolved case of the murder of aircraftswoman Rita Ellis. The case was reopened in 2010 to take advantage of modern forensic techniques, and in 2017 a new DNA profile enabled the police to eliminate 200 of the original suspects. In late 2020, the Thames Valley Police's major crime review team issued a further appeal for anyone with information to come forward.

When No. 1 School of Technical Training moved to RAF Cosford in 1993, they took over guardianship of the Queen's Colour and on 31 October 1997, Her Majesty presented RAF Halton with its second colour.  RAF Halton was the only station to be granted the dignity of two Queen's colours. The move of No. 1 School of Technical Training to RAF Cosford afforded space for the RAF School of Recruit Training to be moved from RAF Swinderby to RAF Halton in July 1993, where it has been ever since. In the year 2004–2005, RAF Halton trained 24,000 personnel, though not all were Phase 1 recruits; some were attending the Airman's Command School which trains Non-Commissioned Officers (NCO) in Phase 2 and 3 disciplines.

From 1917 to 1963, a spur railway line ran from Wendover to Halton to supply coal and goods to the station.

The history of the RAF station and specifically apprenticeship training over the years is preserved by the Trenchard Museum located at RAF Halton, and managed by the RAF Halton Apprentices Association. In 2010 a major project by members of the station re-excavated the training trenches used during the First World War and made them available as an educational exhibit.

No. 613 Volunteer Gliding Squadron, which operated the Grob Vigilant T1, was disbanded in November 2016 by the MoD as part of its Better Defence Estate strategy.

In July 2018, the headquarters of the Logistics Specialist Training Wing (LSTW) relocated to the new Defence College of Logistics, Policing and Administration at Worthy Down Camp in Hampshire. The remaining element of the LSTW, the Logistics Supply Training Squadron, moved to Worthy Down over the months following 24 October 2019.

The following units were here at some point:

RAF Hospital Halton 

Princess Mary's RAF Hospital Halton was opened in 1927 as a large purpose-built military hospital, replacing an earlier makeshift medical facility housed in wooden huts that had been opened in 1919. The hospital was the second unit in the United Kingdom to have a renal facility, and besides developing a cure for Sandfly fever, the hospital was the first in the world to use penicillin on a large scale in 1940, just after its discovery.

The hospital was closed in 1995 due to Government defence cuts. The buildings remained derelict until 2008 when they were demolished for new housing in a development called Princess Mary Gate.

Role and operations 
Halton is the RAF's centre for recruit training and airmen's development training, and also hosts other independent units. Units based at Halton include:

 Recruit Training Squadron – initial training for all non-commissioned entrants to the RAF.
 Airmen's Command Squadron – leadership and management training for non-commissioned officers.
 Specialist Training School (STS) – Health and Safety, Environmental Protection and Quality Management training.
 Joint Information Activities Group (JIAG) – a merger of Defence Media Operations Centre (DMOC) and the Joint Information Operations Training and Advisory Team (JIOTAT).
 Supply & Movements Training Wing, part of the Defence College of Logistics, Police and Administration (DCLPA) – trains RAF personnel in supply, movements and logistic management. It also trains Royal Navy and British Army personnel in movements disciplines.
 Training Analysis Centre (part of No 22 (Training) Group) – carries out training needs analysis, and proposes training strategies for RAF ground trades and branches (with the exception of medical, musician and fire-fighter).
 No 7644 (VR) Squadron, RAuxAF – a specialist media operations squadron.
 Joint Service Gliding Centre – training in the form of gliding for members of the Armed Forces.
 Headquarters Hertfordshire & Buckinghamshire Wing Air Training Corps.

Airfield 
The site has a grass airfield, used mainly by gliders, light aircraft, microlights and the RAF hot air balloon. The airfield is the home of the Royal Air Force Gliding & Soaring Association, Chilterns Gliding Centre, The Halton Aero Club and the RAF Halton Microlight Club.

Based units 
 
Flying and notable non-flying units based at RAF Halton.

Royal Air Force 
No. 22 Group (Training) RAF
 RAF Central Training School
 Recruit Training Squadron
 Airmen's Command Squadron
 International Defence Training (RAF)
 Joint Service Adventurous Training (JSAT)
 Force Development Training Centre (Joint Service Gliding Centre)
 RAF Sports Board
 Training Analysis Centre
Air Training Corps
 Central and East Region
 Hertfordshire & Buckinghamshire Wing Headquarters

No. 38 Group (Air Combat Service Support) RAF
 No. 7644 (VR) Public Relations Squadron (Royal Auxiliary Air Force)
RAF Voluntary Bands Association
 RAF Halton Voluntary Concert Band
RAF Pipe Bands Association
 RAF Halton Pipes and Drums Band

British Army 
Army Recruiting and Training Division
 Defence College of Logistics, Policing and Administration (DCLPA)
 Defence School of Logistics
Logistics Specialist Training Wing
 Logistics Supply Training Squadron

Joint Forces Command 
Directorate of Joint Warfare
 Joint Information Activities Group (JIAG)
 Joint Information Activities Group Headquarters
 Media Operations Centre (MOC)
 Media Information Centre (MIC)

Civilian 
 Specialist Training School (STS)
 RAF Gliding & Soaring Association
 Chilterns Gliding Centre
 RAF Halton Aero Club – 3 x Cessna 152, 1 x Tecnam Sierra and 1 x Piper PA-28
 RAF Halton Microlight Club

Future 
On 7 November 2016, in a speech to the House of Commons by the Defence Secretary, it was announced that the RAF Halton airfield would cease to be part of the Ministry of Defence (MoD) estate and was scheduled to be disposed of by 2022. The following month, a letter from the Defence Secretary to MP David Lidington confirmed the planned phases prior to disposal of the site:

 Phase 1 – Airfield disposal.
 Phase 2 – Relocation of School of Recruit Training and Airmen's Command School to RAF College Cranwell.
 Phase 3 – Relocation / rationalisation of lodger units.

On 28 February 2019, after a revision of the Defence Estates Optimisation Plan, MoD minister Tobias Ellwood MP announced that RAF Halton would not close until at least 2025. This was confirmed in letters sent from the Defence Infrastructure Organisation in May 2019 to local residents, stating that phased withdrawal would commence in 2022 with full disposal achieved in 2025. This was later extended with the airfield not closing until 2027.

See also

 List of Royal Air Force stations

References

Sources

External links

'Mainpoint' magazine – RAF Halton station magazine
Old Haltonians – RAF Halton Apprentices Association
UK Military Aeronautical Information Publication – Halton (EGWN)

Military units and formations established in 1914
Royal Flying Corps airfields
614VGS
Royal Air Force stations in Buckinghamshire
Royal Air Force stations of World War II in the United Kingdom
Buildings and structures in Buckinghamshire

Serco
1914 establishments in the United Kingdom